Richard Harlan (September 19, 1796 – September 30, 1843) was an American paleontologist, anatomist, and physician. He was the first American to devote significant time and attention to vertebrate paleontology and was one of the most important contributors to the field in the early nineteenth century. His work was noted for its focus on objective descriptions, taxonomy and nomenclature. He was the first American to apply Linnaean names to fossils.

Biography
Harlan was born in Philadelphia on September 19, 1796, to Joshua Harlan, a wealthy Quaker merchant, and his wife Sarah Hinchman Harlan, one of their ten children. He was three years older than his brother Josiah Harlan, who would become the first American to visit Afghanistan. Harlan graduated in medicine from the University of Pennsylvania in 1818 after taking time off during his studies to spend a year sailing to India as a ship's surgeon for the British East India Company. In 1821 he was elected professor of comparative anatomy in the Philadelphia museum. One of his passions was the collection and study of human skulls.  In 1822, he was elected as a member to the American Philosophical Society. At its peak, his collection contained 275 skulls, the largest such collection in America. He died of apoplexy in New Orleans, Louisiana.

In 1834, Harlan described and named Basilosaurus ("king lizard"), a genus of early whale, erroneously assuming he had found a Plesiosaurus-like dinosaur.

Works 
He was the author of Fauna Americana, published in 1825, and American Herpetology.

 Fauna Americana; being a Description of the Mammiferous Animals inhabiting North America. (1825, Philadelphia)  Available online via the U.S. National Library of Medicine.

See also
 Harlan's ground sloth
Harlan's muskox

References

Further reading

American mammalogists
American herpetologists
1796 births
1843 deaths
American taxonomists
Corresponding members of the Saint Petersburg Academy of Sciences
People from Chester County, Pennsylvania
Perelman School of Medicine at the University of Pennsylvania alumni
Deaths from bleeding
19th-century American zoologists